Vitali Vladimirovich But (born 16 November 1972) is a Russian football official and a former player who played as a midfielder. He is the general director for FC Chernomorets Novorossiysk.

Playing career
During his professional career, ended at the age of just 27, But played for Tsement Novorossiysk, FC Dynamo Moscow, FC Lokomotiv Moscow, FC Chernomorets Novorossiysk and FC Arsenal Tula. He represented the Soviet Union at the 1991 FIFA World Youth Championship in Portugal.

In May 2009, But re-joined former team Chernomorets, as its general director. His younger brother, Vladimir, was also a footballer — and a midfielder. He too represented Chernomorets Novorossiysk, but spent the better part of his professional career in Germany, namely with Borussia Dortmund.

Traffic incident
On 5 October 2019, it was reported that he was being investigated on two charges - leaving the place of an incident and driving under influence after running over a child with his Range Rover a day before and driving away.

References

External links

1972 births
Living people
People from Novorossiysk
Soviet footballers
Soviet Union youth international footballers
Soviet Union under-21 international footballers
Russian footballers
Russia under-21 international footballers
Association football midfielders
Russian Premier League players
FC Chernomorets Novorossiysk players
FC Dynamo Moscow players
FC Lokomotiv Moscow players
FC Arsenal Tula players
Sportspeople from Krasnodar Krai